"Nana Banana" is a song performed by Israeli singer Netta. The song was released as a digital download on 10 May 2019 as the third single from her debut extended play Goody Bag. The song was written by Nathan Goshen, Stav Beger and Netta Barzilai.

Live performances
Netta performed the song live on 18 May 2019 at the Eurovision Song Contest 2019 as one of the interval acts which took place at the Expo Tel Aviv in Tel Aviv, Israel.

Track listing

Personnel 
Credits adapted from Tidal.
 Stav Beger – producer, composer, background vocals, engineer, keyboards, programmer
 Nathan Goshen – composer, background vocals
 Netta Barzilai – composer, background vocals, vocals
 Liron Carakukly – background vocals
 Eyal Sela – flute

Charts

Release history

References

2019 singles
2019 songs
Netta Barzilai songs
English-language Israeli songs
BMG Rights Management singles